Genova is a 1953 Indian war film, directed by F. Nagoor and produced by E. P. Eppan. The film stars M. G. Ramachandran, B. S. Saroja and P. S. Veerappa. The film had musical score by M. S. Viswanathan, Gnanamani, Kalyanam. It was filmed simultaneously in Malayalam and Tamil, with the Tamil version releasing two months after the Malayalam version.

Cast

Soundtrack 
Music was composed by M. S. Viswanathan, M. S. Gnanamani and T. A. Kalyanam and lyrics were written by Suratha, Ramani and Rajamani.

Tamil track list 
The playback singers consists of A. M. Rajah, P. Leela and A. P. Komala.

References

External links 
 

1950s Malayalam-language films
1950s multilingual films
1950s romance films
1950s war drama films
1953 films
Films about rape in India
Films scored by M. S. Viswanathan
Films shot in Chennai
Indian black-and-white films
Indian multilingual films
Films scored by T. A. Kalyanam
Films scored by M. S. Gnanamani
Indian war drama films
Malayalam films remade in other languages
War romance films